Noceda del Bierzo is a village and municipality in the region of El Bierzo (province of León, Community of Castile and León, (Spain)).

Municipalities in El Bierzo